The Grand Staircase is an immense sequence of sedimentary rock layers that stretch south from Bryce Canyon National Park and Grand Staircase–Escalante National Monument, through Zion National Park, and into Grand Canyon National Park.

Characterization
In the 1870s, geologist Clarence Dutton first conceptualized this region as a huge stairway ascending out of the bottom of the Grand Canyon northward with the cliff edge of each layer forming giant steps. Dutton divided this layer cake of Earth history into five steps from the youngest (uppermost) rocks:
Pink Cliffs 
Grey Cliffs 
White Cliffs 
Vermilion Cliffs
Chocolate Cliffs

Since then, modern geologists have further divided Dutton's steps into individual rock formations.

Formations in the Grand Staircase starting with the youngest (uppermost) rocks:
Claron Formation
Kaiparowits Formation
Wahweap Formation
Straight Cliffs Formation
Tropic Shale
Dakota Sandstone
Carmel Formation
Temple Cap Formation
Navajo Formation
Kayenta Formation
Moenave Formation
Chinle Formation
Moenkopi Formation
Kaibab Limestone
Toroweap Formation
Coconino Sandstone
Hermit Shale
Supai Group
Surprise Canyon Formation
Redwall Limestone
Temple Butte Limestone
Muav Limestone
Bright Angel Shale
Tapeats Sandstone

Geology

The major sedimentary rock units exposed in the Grand Canyon range in age from 200 million to 600 million years and were deposited in warm shallow seas and near-shore environments.  The nearly 40 identified rock layers of Grand Canyon form one of the most studied geologic columns in the world. 

The oldest exposed formation in Zion National Park is the youngest exposed formation in the Grand Canyon – the ~240‑million-year-old Kaibab Limestone. The Bryce Canyon area to the northeast continues where the Zion area leaves off by presenting Cenozoic-aged rocks that are 100 million years younger. In fact the youngest formation seen in the Zion area is the oldest exposed formation in Bryce Canyon – the Dakota Sandstone. There are, however, shared rock units between all three, creating a super-sequence of formations that geologists call the Grand Staircase. Bryce Canyon's formations are the youngest known units in the Grand Staircase. Younger rock units, if they ever existed, have been removed by erosion. 

These layers have undergone 5000 to 10,000 feet (1500 to 3000 m) of uplift starting about 66 million years ago with the Laramide orogeny which has increased the ability of the Colorado River to cut its channel to make individual plateaus out of the Colorado Plateaus region. The major canyons of the region did not start to form until about five to six million years ago when the Gulf of California opened up and thus lowered the river's base level (its lowest point).

Paleontology
In the 1880s, many large dinosaur skeletons were excavated from southern Utah in regions north of the Grand Staircase. Following these discoveries there was little interest in further exploration. In the late 20th and early 21st centuries there has been greatly renewed interests in the strata of the Grand Staircase, particularly since the exposure and collection of new fossils in previously unexplored strata has a high probability of revealing fossil remnants of hitherto unseen species.

Southern Utah has continued to reward researchers owing to its climatological "sweet spot" for exposing fossil remnants for observation and collection at the surface. At locations south, in Arizona, the climate is so dry that erosion is relatively slow. Further north, the wetter climates encourage growth of forests, which destroy fossils by the actions of roots and soil bacteria. In southern Utah, there are enough strong and wet storms to cause episodic rapid erosion and the consequent exposure of fossil remains, but with insufficient annual average rainfall to support destructive, deep-rooted plant life.

Gallery
(South to north, climbing the staircase)

See also
Geology of the Grand Canyon area
Grand Staircase–Escalante National Monument

References

The Salt Lake Tribune, May 21, 2006, p. 1: A New Golden Age – "Utah's peak for dinosaur discoveries ended in the 1920s but recent finds have the state on the cusp of another boom"
National Park Service: Bryce Canyon National Park Nature and Geology – The Grand Staircase (public domain text). Not found 4/8/08
 Grand Staircase-Escalante National Monument
 Official Website for the Bureau of Land Management Grand Staircase-Escalante National Monument

External links 

USGS.gov: Photo tour of Grand Staircase

Grand Staircase–Escalante National Monument
Bryce Canyon
Grand Canyon
Colorado Plateau
Geology of Utah
Geology of Arizona
Sandstone formations of the United States